Stallworth may refer to:

Alma G. Stallworth (1932–2020), American politician
Charlie Stallworth (born 1964), Connecticut state legislator
Dave Stallworth (1941–2017), American professional basketball player
Donté Stallworth (born 1980), American football wide receiver
Isaac Stallworth (born 1950), retired American basketball player
James Adams Stallworth (1822–1861), U.S. Representative from Alabama
John Stallworth (born 1952), retired wide receiver who played for the Pittsburgh Steelers
Omarosa Manigault-Stallworth (born 1974), reality show participant
Ron Stallworth (born 1953), retired police officer who infiltrated the ranks of the KKK
Ron Stallworth (born 1966), American professional football player
Taylor Stallworth (born 1995), American football player

See also
Stallworth Stadium, stadium in Baytown, Texas

Surnames
Surnames of English origin
Surnames of British Isles origin
English-language surnames